Eupithecia broui is a moth in the family Geometridae first described by Frederick H. Rindge in 1985. It is found in the US states of Louisiana, Mississippi and coastal North Carolina.

The length of the forewings is 9.5–10.5 mm for males and 9–10 mm for females. The forewings are gray, with numerous grayish-brown scales. The hindwings are slightly paler than the forewings. Adults are on wing in February, March and April.

Etymology
The species is named in honor of Vernon A. Brou, a collector of Louisiana Lepidoptera.

References

Moths described in 1985
broui
Moths of North America